Salem M'Bakata (born 19 April 1998) is a Congolese professional footballer who plays as a right-back for Super League Greece club Aris.

Club career
On 4 February 2022, Aris officially announced the signing of the Congolese defender on a free transfer, until the summer of 2024.

International career
In 2015, M'Bakata received a callup to the DR Congo U20s for a friendly against the England U20s, which he did not accept, citing his focus being at the club level.

Career statistics

References

External links
 

1998 births
Living people
Footballers from Kinshasa
Democratic Republic of the Congo footballers
Association football midfielders
Ligue 2 players
Super League Greece players
FC Sochaux-Montbéliard players
Aris Thessaloniki F.C. players
Democratic Republic of the Congo expatriate footballers
Democratic Republic of the Congo expatriate sportspeople
Democratic Republic of the Congo expatriate sportspeople in France
Democratic Republic of the Congo expatriate sportspeople in Greece
Expatriate footballers in France
Expatriate footballers in Greece